is a Japanese football player.

Career
From 2015, Kyosuke Goto played Montenegrin First League club Mogren and Iskra Danilovgrad. In 2017 he moved to J3 League club YSCC Yokohama.

Club statistics
Updated to 22 February 2018.

References

External links
Profile at YSCC Yokohama

1992 births
Living people
Senshu University alumni
Association football people from Tokyo
Japanese footballers
Japanese expatriate footballers
Montenegrin First League players
J2 League players
J3 League players
FK Mogren players
FK Iskra Danilovgrad players
YSCC Yokohama players
Ventforet Kofu players
Thespakusatsu Gunma players
Iwate Grulla Morioka players
Association football midfielders
Japanese expatriate sportspeople in Montenegro
Expatriate footballers in Montenegro